William Valdés (born January 10, 1994, Havana, Cuba) is a Cuban actor, singer and TV host. He currently resides in Mexico City, Mexico.

Career 
At the age of 5, he attended the National Circus school in Havana. When he was 17, he moved to Miami, and later participated in the first season of the soap opera Grachi, where he portrayed Sibilo "Ora" Santisteban. In 2012, he played Miguel Ángel Samaniego in the soap opera El rostro de la venganza, along with Kimberly Dos Ramos and María Gabriela de Faría, who worked with him on Grachi. In 2014, he began filming the soap opera Voltea pa' que te enamores, a new adaptation of the Venezuelan telenovela of the same name, which debuted in 2015.

In May 2013, Valdés formed the Mexican boy band CD9 with Jos Canela, Alonso Villalpando, Alan Navarro, and Freddy Leyva. They independently released their first single, "The Party", in August. They later signed a recording contract with Sony Music México. Valdés left the group in October, citing "personal reasons", and he was replaced by Bryan Mouque. He later revealed, in a 2016 interview, that he left the group not because of conflict with his members, as he said that he was on good terms with them, but because management promised him food and lodging in Mexico yet could not be able to provide them for him.

In May 2015, Valdés released "#MAS", his first single as a soloist.

Valdés was also a co-host on the Univision morning show ¡Despierta America! before his firing in 2017.

Valdés was also a co-host on the Estrella TV former Morning show ‘’Buenos Días Familia’’ and left the show in January before its cancellation in June 2019.

Filmography

References

External links 
 

1994 births
Living people
Cuban male telenovela actors
Cuban male television actors
21st-century Cuban male actors